Gary J. Volesky (born September 7, 1961) is a retired  United States Army lieutenant general who commanded I Corps from 2017 to 2020.  He previously served as commander of the 101st Airborne Division and commander of the American ground forces in Iraq as part of Combined Joint Task Force – Operation Inherent Resolve.  Volesky retired in February 2020, being succeeded by Lieutenant General Randy George as commander of I Corps.

Biography
From Spokane, Washington, Volesky graduated from Ferris High School in 1979. In 1983, he earned a bachelor's degree in military science from Eastern Washington University. He followed this with a master's degree in Near and Middle Eastern Studies from Princeton University. He graduated from the United States Army Command and General Staff College at Fort Leavenworth, Kansas, and earned another master's degree at the Air War College at Maxwell Air Force Base, Alabama.

Volesky served in the Gulf War, Iraq War and War in Afghanistan. He earned the Silver Star for his actions on 4 April 2004 – later known as "Black Sunday" – that began the Siege of Sadr City.

Volesky served as the U.S. Army's Chief of Public Affairs in Washington, D.C., prior to being appointed commander of the 101st Airborne Division in June 2014.  In 2015, he was deployed with the 101st to Liberia to help the U.S. Agency for International Development (USAID) with the ebola crisis by building treatment facilities and to train aid workers. He later served as commander of the American ground forces in Iraq as part of Combined Joint Task Force – Operation Inherent Resolve.

Volesky replaced Lieutenant General Stephen Lanza as commander of I Corps on 3 April 2017.  He retired in February 2020, after Lieutenant General Randy George succeeded him as I Corps commander.

Consulting
On July 9, 2022, the US Army suspended Volesky from a lucrative consultant’s role after a social media post appearing under his name taunted first lady Jill Biden's support of abortion rights. In response to the U.S. Supreme Court's overturning of Roe v. Wade, Dr. Biden tweeted, “For nearly 50 years, women have had the right to make our own decisions about our bodies. Today, that right was stolen from us.” An account under Volesky’s name replied: “Glad to see you finally know what a woman is.” Volesky had previously responded to a tweet by Rep. Liz Cheney stating the United States House Select Committee on the January 6 Attack was "all about partisan politics".

Awards and decorations

Depictions in media

Volesky is shown in National Geographic's mini-series The Long Road Home.

References

External links

1961 births
Living people
United States Army generals
Eastern Washington University alumni
Princeton University alumni
United States Army personnel of the Iraq War
Recipients of the Legion of Merit
United States Army personnel of the Gulf War
Recipients of the Silver Star
United States Army personnel of the War in Afghanistan (2001–2021)
Air War College alumni
United States Army Command and General Staff College alumni
Military personnel from Spokane, Washington
Recipients of the Distinguished Service Medal (US Army)